Roger Goode is a South African DJ.

Biography
Goode rose to local fame for his first single "In The Beginning", which featured on 5FM's Top 40. This led to him signing with a local dance record label, SheerDance, under which he released his first album, Coming Up for Air in 2001. "In The Beginning" also prompted Purple Eye Records to approach Goode, who allowed Ferry Corsten to remix the track, which went on to the UK Singles Chart (#33, 2002) and MTV's Music Video Chart. At 21, Goode was signed to Pete Tong's London Records, who promoted "In The Beginning" in the Buzz Chart, and showcased the track on Danny Rampling's Weekly Top 10.

During the 2000s, Goode put together the SL Magazine Compilation of dance music produced in South Africa as well as international hits, in conjunction with the Saturday Surgery brought to by Roger Goode [The Goode Dr.] and sponsored by Volkswagen [VW] and SL Magazine.
 
Roger Goode has been hosting the 5fm afternoon drivetime show since 2014 after Gareth Cliff quit his morning show and DJ Fresh took over the morning show. He performs every week day on 5FM's morning breakfast show from 6am to 9am alongside Robbie Cruz, Sushi Rider and Miss Cosmo.

Discography

Albums

Singles

References

External links
 Official Website
 MusicMatch Discography

Living people
South African DJs
South African musicians
Club DJs
South African radio personalities
Electronic dance music DJs
South African radio presenters
1981 births